The Federation Council ( is the upper house of the Federal Assembly of Russia, the parliament of the Russian Federation. Each of the 89 federal subjects of Russia – consisting of 24 republics, 48 oblasts, nine krais, three federal cities, four autonomous okrugs, and one autonomous oblast – sends two senators to the Council, for a total membership of 178 senators.

Of the two senators from each federal subject, one represents the subject's legislative (representative) authority and the other the subject's executive authority.  The current structure of the Federation Council was established through federal law on 8 August 2000. The senator representing the executive authority is appointed by the chief government official in that constituent entity, in effect the region's governor or head. The senator representing the legislative authority is elected by that body for the duration of its term. Senators are appointed to serve on a full-time basis.

Current members

By federal subject (since 2000)

Republics

Adygea

Altai

Bashkortostan

Buryatia

Chechnya

Chuvashia

Crimea

Donetsk People's Republic

Dagestan

Ingushetia

Kabardino-Balkaria

Kalmykia

Karachay-Cherkessia

Karelia

Khakassia

Komi

Lugansk People's Republic

Mari El

Mordovia

North Ossetia-Alania

Tatarstan

Tuva

Udmurtia

Yakutia

Krais

Altai Krai

Kamchatka Krai

Khabarovsk Krai

Krasnodar Krai

Krasnoyarsk Krai

Perm Krai

Primorsky Krai

Stavropol Krai

Zabaykalsky Krai

Oblasts

Amur Oblast

Arkhangelsk Oblast

Astrakhan Oblast

Belgorod Oblast

Bryansk Oblast

Chelyabinsk Oblast

Irkutsk Oblast

Ivanovo Oblast

Kaliningrad Oblast

Kaluga Oblast

Kemerovo Oblast

Kherson Oblast

Kirov Oblast

Kostroma Oblast

Kurgan Oblast

Kursk Oblast

Leningrad Oblast

Lipetsk Oblast

Magadan Oblast

Moscow Oblast

Murmansk Oblast

Nizhny Novgorod Oblast

Novgorod Oblast

Novosibirsk Oblast

Omsk Oblast

Orenburg Oblast

Oryol Oblast

Penza Oblast

Pskov Oblast

Rostov Oblast

Ryazan Oblast

Sakhalin Oblast

Samara Oblast

Saratov Oblast

Smolensk Oblast

Sverdlovsk Oblast

Tambov Oblast

Tomsk Oblast

Tula Oblast

Tver Oblast

Tyumen Oblast

Ulyanovsk Oblast

Vladimir Oblast

Volgograd Oblast

Vologda Oblast

Voronezh Oblast

Yaroslavl Oblast

Zaporozhye Oblast

Autonomous Okrugs

Chukotka

Khanty-Mansi Autonomous Okrug

Nenets Autonomous Okrug

Yamalo-Nenets Autonomous Okrug

Autonomous Oblasts

Jewish Autonomous Oblast

Federal Cities

Moscow

Saint Petersburg

Sevastopol

Notes

a.  The federal subjects of Russia include several not internationally recognized as part of Russia. The Republic of Crimea and Sevastopol were annexed in 2014, and Donetsk People's Republic, Luhansk People's Republic, Zaporizhzhia Oblast and Kherson Oblast in 2022.

References

External links
Current members of the Federation Council
A Just Russia — For Truth members of the Federation Council
Liberal Democratic Party of Russia members of the Federation Council
United Russia members of the Federation Council

List
Federation Council
Federation Council